Brachybacterium conglomeratum is a species of Gram positive, facultatively anaerobic, whitish yellow to pale brown pigmented bacterium. The cells are coccoid during the stationary phase, and irregular rods during the exponential phase. The species was originally classified as Micrococcus conglomeratus for over 60 years, until most species were reclassified as Brachybacterium conglomeratum in 1995.  The name is derived from Latin conglomeratum (rolled together).

References

External links 

Type strain of Brachybacterium conglomeratum at BacDive -  the Bacterial Diversity Metadatabase

Micrococcales
Bacteria described in 1995